What's for Dinner? is a Canadian cooking show.

What's for Dinner? may also refer to:

 What's for Dinner? (TV series), South Korean TV series
 What's for Dinner? (album), album by The King Khan & BBQ Show
 "What's for Dinner?" (Severance), 2022 TV episode